Siah Kalleh (also Romanized as Sīāh Kalleh, Seyāh Koleh, Sīāh Kaleh, Sīāh Kolah, Siāh Qal‘eh, and Sīyāh Kaleh) is a village in Dorud Rural District, in the Central District of Dorud County, Lorestan Province, Iran. At the 2006 census, its population was 2,781, in 564 families.

References 

Towns and villages in Dorud County